Brightman may refer to:

Al Brightman (1923–1992), American basketball player and coach
Alex Brightman (born 1987), American stage actor
Amelia Brightman (born 1979), English singer and songwriter
Edgar S. Brightman (1884–1953), philosopher and Christian theologian
Frank Edward Brightman (1856–1932), English scholar
Jerry Brightman (born 1953), steel guitarist
Robert A. Brightman, American anthropologist
Sarah Brightman (born 1960), English classical crossover soprano, actress and dancer
Thomas Brightman (1562-1607), English clergyman and biblical commentator 
John Brightman, Baron Brightman (1911-2006), English judge.

Other
Bright Man is a Robot Master in the Mega Man series
Brightman Street Bridge, a bridge in Fall River/Somerset, Massachusetts